Kanawha Head is an unincorporated community in Upshur County, West Virginia, United States. Kanawha Head had a post office with ZIP code 26228.

The community takes its name from the nearby Little Kanawha River.

References

Unincorporated communities in Upshur County, West Virginia
Unincorporated communities in West Virginia